Walter Grimshaw (12 March 1832 – 27 December 1890) was a 19th-century British composer of chess problems. In 1854 he won the first ever chess problem composition tourney in London. He is perhaps best known for giving his name to the Grimshaw, a popular problem theme.

Sample compositions

This is one of his problems, a mate in five (white moves first, and must checkmate black within five moves against any defence) first published in the Illustrated London News in 1850. The key is 1.Bc8 which threatens 2.Qc5# or Qd2#. To defend, black plays 1...Bxc8 white plays 2.Qf6 (threatening 3.c4#) and now a Grimshaw interference comes into play: black can defend by cutting off the white queen from the defence of d6 with 2...Ne6 or 2...Be6, but this interferes with the rook's guard of e5, and so allows 3.Qe5#. If instead black plays 2...Re6, this interferes with the bishop's guard of f5 which is significant after 3.Qd4+ Kxd4 4.Nf5+, because the knight cannot be captured. Instead, there follows 4...Kd5  5.c4#.

The second example is one of Grimshaw's better-known problems, a mate in three composed for a competition organised by the Chess Players Chronicle, 1852-54. The key is the paradoxical 1.Rf1, sacrificing a strong white piece. This carries the threats 2.Nf3 (leading to various mates delivered by the d5 rook) and 2.f3+ (leading to knight mates on f5 or g2). Black's obvious defence, 1...exf1Q is answered by 2.Nf3 Kxf3 3.Rd2#. After 1...f3 (giving black a flight at f4), white plays his rook back to where it came from (a switchback) to take advantage of the newly opened fourth rank: 2.Rg1 any 3.Rg4#.

External links
 Obituary in British Chess Magazine

1832 births
1890 deaths
Chess composers
English chess players
19th-century chess players